Partido Federal may refer to:

Federalist Party (Argentina) – a 19th century political party in Argentina
Federal Party (1973) –  a provincial political party in modern Argentina
Federal Party (Puerto Rico)
Partido Federal ng Pilipinas – a political party in the Philippines

See also 

 Federal Party (disambiguation)